Red Cedar Lake is a lake in Barron and Washburn counties, Wisconsin, United States. The community of Mikana, Wisconsin is located on the lake's western shore. Fish species enzootic to Red Cedar Lake include bluegill, largemouth bass, northern pike, smallmouth bass, and walleye.

References

External links
Red Cedar Lake at Lake-Link.com

Lakes of Wisconsin
Lakes of Barron County, Wisconsin
Bodies of water of Washburn County, Wisconsin
State Natural Areas of Wisconsin